Brouwer is a large lunar impact crater that is located in the southern hemisphere on the far side of the Moon. Intruding into the western rim of Brouwer is the younger and somewhat smaller crater Langmuir. Further to the east-southeast is the larger walled plain Blackett.

This is an old crater formation with a rim that has been heavily worn due to subsequent impacts. Parts of the rim to the east and north can still be traced in the irregular terrain, but the southern rim is almost completely disintegrated. The interior floor is rough in the southeastern half, and somewhat more level and less rough to the northwest. Lying just to the southeast of the crater midpoint is the satellite crater Brouwer H. If the floor once possessed a central peak, it may have been overlaid by this last-mentioned formation.

Satellite craters
By convention these features are identified on lunar maps by placing the letter on the side of the crater midpoint that is closest to Brouwer.

References

External links
 

Impact craters on the Moon